Amr bin Umayyah al-Damri was a companion of the Islamic Prophet Muhammad. Amr bin Umayyah al-Damri was sent to assassinate Abu Sufyan.

Military campaigns

He participated in The Mission of Amr bin Umayyah al-Damri in the year 627. Amr bin Umayyah al-Damri was sent to assassinate Abu Sufyan to avenge Khubyab bin Adi. According to the Muslim scholar Safiur Rahman Mubarakpuri, the Quraysh ordered Khubyab bin Adi to be crucified by Uqba bin al-Harith during the Expedition of Al Raji because he had killed Uqba bin al-Harith's father. Three polytheists were killed by Muslims and one was captured.

He was also one sent to investigate the events of the Expedition of Bir Maona. When the news of this massacre reached Muhammad, he was greatly grieved and sent Amr bin Umayyah al-Damri and an Ansar to investigate the whole matter. On his way back to Qarqara, Amr bin Umayyah rested in the shade of a tree, and there two men of Banu Kilab joined him. When they slept, Amr killed them both, thinking that by doing that he would avenge some of his killed companions.

Then he found out that they had been given a pledge of protection by Muhammad. He told Muhammad what he had done. Then Muhammad said to ‘Amr, that he (Muhammad) must pay a debt for the killing of those he pledged protection to (the Dhimmi's)

Envoy
He was sent as an envoy to the king of Abyssinia (now Ethiopia) called Aṣḥama ibn Abjar to invite him to Islam.

See also
List of battles of Muhammad

References

Companions of the Prophet